NXT TakeOver: XXV was the 25th NXT TakeOver professional wrestling livestreaming event produced by WWE. It was held exclusively for wrestlers from the promotion's NXT brand division. The event aired exclusively on the WWE Network and took place on June 1, 2019, at the Webster Bank Arena in Bridgeport, Connecticut.

Seven matches were contested at the event, including two taped for the following week's episode of NXT. In the main event, Adam Cole defeated Johnny Gargano to win the NXT Championship. The undercard saw NXT Women's Champion Shayna Baszler and NXT North American Champion Velveteen Dream defeating Io Shirai and Tyler Breeze, respectively, to retain their titles, and Street Profits (Angelo Dawkins and Montez Ford) won the vacant NXT Tag Team Championship in a four-way ladder match.

Production

Background
TakeOver was a series of professional wrestling shows that began in May 2014, as WWE's then-developmental league NXT held their second WWE Network-exclusive event, billed as TakeOver. In subsequent months, the "TakeOver" moniker became the brand used by WWE for all of their NXT live specials. Titled for being the 25th NXT TakeOver event, TakeOver: XXV was held on June 1, 2019, at the Webster Bank Arena in Bridgeport, Connecticut.

Storylines 

The card comprised five matches. The matches resulted from scripted storylines, where wrestlers portrayed heroes, villains, or less distinguishable characters that built tension and culminated in a wrestling match or series of matches. Results were predetermined by WWE's writers on the NXT brand, while storylines were produced on their weekly television program, NXT.

At TakeOver: New York, Johnny Gargano defeated Adam Cole in a two-out-of-three falls match to win the vacant NXT Championship. On the May 15, 2019 episode of NXT, a rematch between the two for the title was scheduled for TakeOver: XXV.

During the 2019 WWE Superstar Shake-up, NXT Tag Team Champions The Viking Raiders (Erik and Ivar) were drafted to Raw. They then voluntarily relinquished the titles on the May 1, 2019 taping of NXT (aired May 15), though had one final title defense against Street Profits (Angelo Dawkins and Montez Ford) that ended in disqualification after The Forgotten Sons (Wesley Blake and Steve Cutler) and Oney Lorcan and Danny Burch got involved. A fatal four-way tag team ladder match was later scheduled for TakeOver: XXV between Lorcan and Burch, Street Profits, The Forgotten Sons, and The Undisputed Era (Kyle O'Reilly and Bobby Fish).

Event

In the opening match, Matt Riddle faced Roderick Strong. Riddle performed a Cradle Belly to Back Inverted Mat Slam on Strong to win.

Next, The Undisputed Era (Bobby Fish and Kyle O'Reilly), The Street Profits (Angelo Dawkins and Montez Ford), Oney Lorcan and Danny Burch and The Forgotten Sons (Steve Cutler and Wesley Blake) competed in a Ladder match for the vacant NXT Tag Team Championship. Ford retrieved the belts to win the title.

After that, The Velveteen Dream defended the NXT North American Championship against Tyler Breeze. Dream performed a Purple Rainmaker on Breeze to retain the title. Following the match, the two would earn each other’s respect and take a selfie together.

In the penultimate match, Shayna Baszler defended the NXT Women's Championship against Io Shirai. Baszler forced Shirai to submit to the Kirifuda Clutch to retain the title. After the match, Shirai struck Baszler with a kendo stick and performed a Moonsault on Baszler. Shirai then performed a Moonsault with a chair on Baszler.

Main event 
In the main event, Johnny Gargano defended the NXT Championship against Adam Cole. Gargano performed a Slingshot DDT on Cole for a near-fall. Cole performed a "Panama Sunrise" off the ring apron on Gargano and scored a near-fall. Cole applied the  "Garga-No-Escape" but Gargano escaped. Gargano performed a "Last Shot" on Cole for a near-fall. Cole performed a Last Shot on Gargano for a near-fall. Gargano inadvertently performed a Suicide Dive on Drake Wuertz, the referee, and then performed a Superkick into a chair on Cole. Gargano applied the Garga-No-Escape but Cole escaped. Cole performed a second Panama Sunrise and a second Last Shot on Gargano to win the title. As the show closed, Cole, Kyle O'Reilly, Bobby Fish, and Roderick Strong posed and celebrated Cole's victory.

Reception 
NXT TakeOver: XXV was met with highly positive reviews among fans and wrestling journalists. Larry Csonka of 411Mania gave the show an 8/10. He described the event by stating "To the surprise of absolutely no one, NXT TakeOver: XXV was another great TakeOver event with all four titles on the line a big moment for some stars that have been waiting for their chance on the big stage, and a new champion being crowned as the power in NXT shifts."

Dave Meltzer of the Wrestling Observer Newsletter also praised the event with all the matches getting positive ratings. Rating out of a possible 5 stars, he awarded Matt Riddle vs. Roderick Strong and the NXT Tag Team Championship ladder matches 4.5 stars, the NXT North American Championship match of Velveteen Dream vs. Tyler Breeze 3.75 stars, the NXT Women's Championship match of Shayna Baszler vs. Io Shirai 4 stars and the NXT Championship match of Johnny Gargano vs. Adam Cole 5.25 stars, making it only the second WWE match Meltzer has given more than 5 stars.

Results

References

External links
 

2019 WWE Network events
XXV
Events in Connecticut
Professional wrestling in Connecticut
June 2019 events in the United States
2019 in Connecticut